Sfoglina, Sfoglino is someone who makes sfoglia, a form of Italian fresh pasta which resembles a sheet. A sfoglina is historically seen as a middle-aged woman who rolls and stretches out the dough with a rolling pin called a mattarello, on a large wooden pastry board called a taglieri. Their typical handmade creations are tagliatelle, tortellini and other egg-pasta, also many times stuffed pasta like tortelloni or cappeletti.

Definition 
The Sfoglina tradition comes from the Emilia-Romagna region, where sfoglina is also called “azdora” or “zdoura” in both Emilian and Bolognese dialects. Bologna is the city where this figure and the art of sfoglia (pastry) was born. Its housewives used to say, “You will know when you did a good sfoglia because if you lift it in the direction of light, you will be able to see the Sanctuary of the Madonna di San Luca”.

Sfoglina is centuries old and was present in every Emilian family. The tradition of home-made fresh pasta is still very widespread. Sfoglinas also work in restaurants and trattorias, although less often. Nevertheless, she still represents the cookery art of Emilia-Romagna, as made by its artisans.

Practices 
Fresh pasta is usually produced by sfoglinas in a small laboratory that is simply furnished. While they are working, they usually wear a white uniform with an apron and listen to Italian songs.

The sense of community is strong in the laboratories. They create an environment redolent of Italian domestic culture. These conditions are important in order to guarantee the authenticity of the product. Sfoglina is associated with festivities and Sunday celebrations where women together prepare the meal for the family. This convention can be seen at the amateur level as well from the name of the fresh pasta competitions, the most famous is “Miss Tagliatella”.

Professionalization 
The practice of sfoglina is not regulated, either nationally or regionally. Supporters of professionalization claim that the lack of regulation stems from the fact that it is considered a typically female job and as such does not qualify.

The idea of professionalisation dates from 2004 when Emilian Franco Grillini, a former member of Parliament, submitted a two-part bill, one involving the creation of a committee for the protection of the Emilia-Romagnan sfoglia and another to regulate the profession of “sfoglina” and “sfoglino”. 

Moreover, to Grillini it was important to free sfoglia from its traditional stereotypes: opening the profession to men. Therefore, according to Grillini's vision, such a law should have enhanced the dignity and prestige of the “sfoglinas” craft. The proposal was ultimately dismissed.

Another attempt at regulation was made in 2017 by then democratic senator Sergio Lo Giudice. He proposed training courses and the accreditation of sfoglinas and sfoglinos at a regional level. Lo Giudice's bill was also rejected.

Promotion 
Cultural intermediaries and producers have allied to promote consumption of local, traditional and sustainable produce. Initiatives to promote sfoglinas’ work, the inauguration of VSB (acronym of “Vecchia Scuola Bolognese”) represents an attempt to restore dignity and visibility to the craft. VSB is a space in Bologna, dedicated to food culture. It is considered the house of sfoglinas, under the guide of sfoglina Alessandra Spinsi. The school offers many courses for beginners and professionals to learn traditional cooking.

See also 
 Local food
 Glocalization
 Consumerism
 McDonaldization
 List of pasta

References

External links 
 Vecchia Scuola Bolognese
 Miscusi
WebIndia

The Standard: Pasta A-Z https://a.co/d/b1a3cYC

Italian cuisine
Pasta industry